The 1975 season of the Venezuelan Primera División, the top category of Venezuelan football, was played by 8 teams. The national champions were Portuguesa.

Results

First stage

Final Stage

External links
Venezuela 1975 season at RSSSF

Ven
Venezuelan Primera División seasons
Prim